Patrice H. Kunesh is an American attorney who has served as commissioner of the Administration for Native Americans since March 2023.

Early life and education 
Kunesh is a member of the Standing Rock Lakota descent. She earned a Bachelor of Arts degree in French language and literature from Colorado State University, a Juris Doctor from the University of Colorado Law School, and a Master of Public Administration from the Harvard Kennedy School.

Career 
From 1989 to 1995, Kunesh worked as a staff attorney for the Native American Rights Fund. From 1994 to 2005, she was legal counsel for the Mashantucket Pequot Tribe in Connecticut. She was a leadership fellow at the Bush Foundation for one year and worked as an associate professor of law at the University of South Dakota School of Law from 2005 to 2011. From 2011 to 2013, she served as deputy solicitor of the United States Department of the Interior. From 2015 to 2020, she served as director of the Center for Indian Country Development at the Federal Reserve Bank of Minneapolis. Kunesh joined the development team at the Native American Rights Fund in 2020.

On June 22, 2022, President Joe Biden announced Kunesh's nomination to serve as commissioner for the Administration for Native Americans. On March 8, 2023, the U.S. Senate voted 57-35 to confirm Kunesh to serve as the commissioner of the Administration for Native Americans.

References 

Living people
Standing Rock Sioux people
Native American lawyers
Colorado State University alumni
University of Colorado Law School alumni
Harvard Kennedy School alumni
Harvard University alumni
University of South Dakota faculty
United States Department of the Interior officials
Year of birth missing (living people)